{{Infobox martial artist
|name=Jorina Baars
|other_names=
|image=Jorina baars-1631302731.png
|image_size=
|alt=
|caption=
|birth_name=
|birth_date=
|birth_place=Den Helder, Netherlands
|death_date=
|death_place=
|death_cause=
|residence=
|nationality= Dutch
|height=
|weight= 
|weight_class=Welterweight   Featherweight (Muay Thai)|reach=
|style=Boxing, Muay Thai, Kickboxing,
Dutch Muay Thai,
|stance=
|fighting_out_of=
|team=
|trainer=
|rank=
|years_active=
|box_win=
|box_kowin=
|box_loss=
|box_koloss=
|box_draw=
|box_nc=
|kickbox_win=43
|kickbox_kowin=18
|kickbox_loss=2
|kickbox_koloss=
|kickbox_draw=3
|kickbox_nc=
|mma_kowin=
|mma_subwin=1
|mma_decwin=
|mma_koloss=3
|mma_subloss=
|mma_decloss=
|mma_draw=
|mma_nc=
|relatives=
|university=
|school=
|url=
|boxrec=
|sherdog=73230
|footnotes=
|updated=
}}
Jorina Baars (born ) is a Dutch female kickboxing, K1 Muay Thai fighter, based in Den Helder, Netherlands. She has competed professionally since 2004 and is the current ISKA Welterweight World Muay Thai champion and the Enfusion Women's Featherweight Champion. 

As of September 2022, she is ranked as the #5 female pound for pound fighter in the world by Combat Press, and #4 by Beyond Kick.

Early life
Baars started training in kickboxing at the age of 7, and she had her first bout at the age of 12. She was very close to her father, who used to watch all of her fights until his untimely passing.

Martial arts career
Kickboxing
Jorina Baars made her debut in 2000, with a win over Tatjana Bosman. Over the next eight years, she amassed an undefeated record of 22 wins and three draws. During this time she achieved two notable wins over Hatice Ozyurt, and a win against Nong Toom.

In 2009, she participated in the ISKA World Championship Thaiboxing, where she faced Helene Garnett for the ISKA Women's World Muay Thai Welterweight Title. Baars won the fight by a split decision.

During Gladiators of the Cathedral II Baars fought Chantal Ughi for the ITMF European Championship. Baars won a split decision.

After another four wins, she fought Cristiane Justino for the inaugural Lion Fight Muay Thai Women's World Welterweight Championship. Baars won a unanimous decision. Her first title defense was a rematch against Chantal Ughi. Baars won the fight by TKO, after Ughi retired after the third round. Her second title defense came against Martina Jindrová during Lion Fight 25. Baars won a unanimous decision. The third title defense came during Lion Fight 31 against Angela Whitley. Baars won a unanimous decision.

After winning another four fights against Irene Martens, Athina Efmorfiadi, Anke Van Gestel and Amel Dehby, Baars signed with ONE Championship. She made her promotional debut during ONE Championship: Age Of Dragons against Christina Breuer. Baars suffered her first career loss, by a split decision.

In 2021, Baars signed a new contract with Lion Fight. She was scheduled to face Claire Clements in her promotional debut, at Lion Fight 68 on August 22, 2021. Baars won the fight by unanimous decision.

Baars faced Sarah Worsfold for the vacant Enfusion Women's Featherweight Championship at Enfusion 109 on June 18, 2022. She won the fight by unanimous decision. Baars made her first title defense against Erica Björnestrand at Enfusion 116 on November 19, 2022. She won the fight by unanimous decision. Baars made her second title defense against Emma Abrahamsson at Enfusion 120 on March 18, 2023. She won the fight by a fourth-round technical knockout.

Mixed martial arts
Baars made her MMA debut against Cindy Dandois in 2011. Dandois won by TKO at the end of the second round. She suffered TKO losses to Danielle West and Maria Hougaard. Her first and, so far, only win came through a submission, against Alexandra Buch.

Championships and awards
Kickboxing
Enfusion
2022 Enfusion Women's Featherweight Champion (inaugural; current) 

Muay Thai
AwakeningFighters.com
2015 Inspirational Female Fighter of the Year 
2015 Fight of the Year vs. Martina Jindrová at Lion Fight 25
2014 Fight of the Year vs. Cristiane Justino at Lion Fight 14
2014 Most Viewed Female Fighter
Lion Fight
2014/2016 – Lion Fight Women's World Welterweight Champion (inaugural; 2 defenses; current)
International Sport Karate Association
2009 – ISKA World Welterweight Title (66 kg)
Other
2012 – Amazon of K-1 Muay Thai Grand Prix (Winner)
2011 – National Dutch Title (147 lbs)

Muay Thai record
{{Fight record start|title=Kickboxing & Muay Thai Record|record= 43 Wins (18 (T)KO's), 2 Losses, 3 Draws}}
|- style="background:#cfc;"
|
| style="text-align:center;"|Win
| Emma Abrahamsson
|Enfusion 120
| Alkmaar, Netherlands
|TKO (Body strike)
|align=center|4
|align=center|
| style="text-align:center;"|43–2–3
|-
! style=background:white colspan=9 |
|- style="background:#cfc;"
|
| style="text-align:center;"|Win
| Erica Björnestrand
|Enfusion 116
| Groningen, Netherlands
| Decision (Unanimous)
|align=center|5
|align=center|3:00
| style="text-align:center;"|42–2–3
|-
! style=background:white colspan=9 |
|- style="background:#cfc;"
|
| style="text-align:center;"|Win
| Sarah Worsfold
|Enfusion 109
| Groningen, Netherlands
|Decision (Unanimous)
|align=center|5
|align=center|3:00
| style="text-align:center;"|41–2–3
|-
! style=background:white colspan=9 |
|- style="background:#cfc;"
|
| style="text-align:center;"|Win
| Claire Clements
|Lion Fight 68 
| Glasgow, Scotland
| style="text-align:center;"|Decision (unanimous)
|align=center|5
|align=center|3:00
| style="text-align:center;"|40–2–3
|-  style="background:#FFBBBB;"
|
| style="text-align:center;"|Loss
|  Christina Breuer
| ONE Championship: Age Of Dragons 
|  Beijing, China
| style="text-align:center;"|Decision (split)
|align=center|3
|align=center|5:00
| style="text-align:center;"|39–2–3
|- style="background:#cfc;"
|
| style="text-align:center;"|Win
| Amel Dehby
|WFL: Final 8 World Grand Prix
| Almere, Netherlands
| style="text-align:center;"|KO (Knee)
|align=center|1
|align=center|2:03
| style="text-align:center;"|39–1–3
|- style="background:#cfc;"
|
| style="text-align:center;"|Win
| Athina Efmorfiadi
|Bellator Kickboxing 9 
| Budapest, Hungary
| style="text-align:center;"|TKO (Knees)
|align=center|2
|align=center|2:28
| style="text-align:center;"|38–1–3
|-
|- style="background:#cfc;"
|
| style="text-align:center;"|Win
| Anke Van Gestel
|Bellator Kickboxing 7 
| San Jose, CA
|Decision (Unanimous)
|align=center|3
|align=center|3:00
| style="text-align:center;"|37–1–3
|-
|- style="background:#cfc;"
|
| style="text-align:center;"|Win
| Irene Martens
|Bellator Kickboxing 6: Budapest
| Budapest, Hungary
| style="text-align:center;"|TKO
|align=center|3
|align=center|2:55
| style="text-align:center;"|36–1–3
|-
|- style="background:#cfc;"
|
| style="text-align:center;"|Win
| Angela Whitley
|Lion Fight 31
| Mashantucket, Connecticut, United States
|Decision (Unanimous)
|align=center|5
|align=center|3:00
| style="text-align:center;"|35–1–3
|-
! style=background:white colspan=9 |
|- style="background:#cfc;"
|
| style="text-align:center;"|Win
| Stephanie Glew
|Caged Muay Thai 8
| Logan City, Queensland, Australia
|Decision (Unanimous)
|align=center|5
|align=center|3:00
| style="text-align:center;"|34–1–3
|- style="background:#cfc;"
|
| style="text-align:center;"|Win
| Martina Jindrová
|Lion Fight 25
| Temecula, California, United States
|Decision (Unanimous)
|align=center|5
|align=center|3:00
| style="text-align:center;"|33–1–3
|-
! style=background:white colspan=9 |
|- style="background:#cfc;"
|
| style="text-align:center;"|Win
| Gaenpet Mor Rattana Bundit
| 
| Thailand
| style="text-align:center;"|TKO 
|align=center|1
|align=center|
| style="text-align:center;"|32–1–3
|-
|- style="background:#cfc;"
|
| style="text-align:center;"|Win
| Chantal Ughi
|Lion Fight 20
| Mashantucket, Connecticut, United States
| style="text-align:center;"|TKO (Retirement)
|align=center|3
|align=center|3:00
| style="text-align:center;"|31–1–3
|-
! style=background:white colspan=9 |
|- style="background:#cfc;"
|
| style="text-align:center;"|Win
| Cristiane Justino
|Lion Fight 14
| Las Vegas, Nevada, United States
|Decision (Unanimous)
|align=center|5
|align=center|3:00
| style="text-align:center;"|30–1–3
|-
! style=background:white colspan=9 |
|- style="background:#cfc;"
|
| style="text-align:center;"|Win
| Katrin Dirheimer
|Amazon of K1 Grand Prix Final
| Herne, Germany
|Decision (Unanimous)
|align=center|5
|align=center|3:00
| style="text-align:center;"|29–1–3
|- style="background:#cfc;"
|
| style="text-align:center;"|Win
| Martina Jindrová
|Amazon of K1 Grand Prix Semi-Finals
| Herne, Germany
|Decision (Unanimous)
|align=center|5
|align=center|3:00
| style="text-align:center;"|28–1–3
|- style="background:#cfc;"
|
| style="text-align:center;"|Win
| Julia Symannek
|Amazon of K1 Grand Prix Quarter-Finals
| Herne, Germany
| style="text-align:center;"|TKO
|align=center|2
|align=center|
| style="text-align:center;"|27–1–3
|- style="background:#cfc;"
|
| style="text-align:center;"|Win
| Anissa Haddaoui
| 
| Den Helder, Netherlands
| style="text-align:center;"|TKO
|align=center|4
|align=center|
| style="text-align:center;"|26–1–3
|- style="background:#cfc;"
|
| style="text-align:center;"|Win
| Chantal Ughi
|Gladiators of the Cathedral II
| Den Helder, Netherlands
| style="text-align:center;"|Split Decision
|align=center|5
|align=center|3:00
| style="text-align:center;"|25–1–3
|-
! style=background:white colspan=9 |
|- style="background:#fbb;"
|
| style="text-align:center;"|LossOrinta van der Zee is T2F Ladies Champ Fightweek.nl, 2 oktober 2009.
| Orinta van der Zee
|Time2Fight Ladies Tournament Final
| Hoorn, Netherlands
| style="text-align:center;"|
|align=center|5	
|align=center|3:00
| style="text-align:center;"|24–1–3
|- style="background:#cfc;"
|
| style="text-align:center;"|Win
| Najat Hasnouni-Alaoui
|Time2Fight Ladies Tournament Semifinals
| Hoorn, Netherlands
| style="text-align:center;"|
|align=center|
|align=center|
| style="text-align:center;"|24–0–3
|- style="background:#cfc;"
|
| style="text-align:center;"|Win
| Helene Garnett
|ISKA World Championship Thaiboxing
| Sheffield, England
| style="text-align:center;"|Split Decision
|align=center|5
|align=center|2:00
| style="text-align:center;"|23–0–3
|-
! style=background:white colspan=9 |
|- style="background:#cfc;"
|
| style="text-align:center;"|Win
| Rachida Hilali
|Only the Strongest
| Ter Apel, Netherlands 
| style="text-align:center;"|Decision
|align=center|5
|align=center|2:00
| style="text-align:center;"|22–0–3
|- style="background:#cfc;"
|
| style="text-align:center;"|Win
| Najat Hasnouni-Alaoui
| KOE: Tough Is Not Enough
| Rotterdam, Netherlands
| style="text-align:center;"|Decision
|align=center|3
|align=center|3:00
| style="text-align:center;"|21–0–3
|- style="background:#cfc;"
|
| style="text-align:center;"|Win
| Cindy Venema
| 
| Utrecht, Netherlands
| style="text-align:center;"|Decision
|align=center|
|align=center|
| style="text-align:center;"|20–0–3
|- style="background:#cfc;"
|
| style="text-align:center;"|Win
| Deborah Simabuku
|Only the Strongest
| Ter Apel, Netherlands
| style="text-align:center;"|TKO
|align=center|3
|align=center|
| style="text-align:center;"|19–0–3
|- style="background:#cfc;"
|
| style="text-align:center;"|Win
| Nong Toom
|Battle of Arnhem 6
| Arnhem, Netherlands
| style="text-align:center;"|Decision
|align=center|3
|align=center|3:00
| style="text-align:center;"|18–0–3
|- style="background:#cfc;"
|
| style="text-align:center;"|Win
| Loli Muñoz Garcia
|Only the Strongest
| Ter Apel, Netherlands
| style="text-align:center;"|Decision
|align=center|3
|align=center|3:00
| style="text-align:center;"|17–0–3
|- style="background:#cfc;"
|
| style="text-align:center;"|Win
| Hatice Ozyurt
|Thai Boxing Gala
| Den Helder, Netherlands
| style="text-align:center;"|TKO
|align=center|3
|align=center|
| style="text-align:center;"|16–0–3
|- style="background:#cfc;"
|
| style="text-align:center;"|Win
| Chajmaa Bellakhal
|Thai Boxing Gala
| Eindhoven, Netherlands
| style="text-align:center;"|Decision
|align=center|3
|align=center|3:00
| style="text-align:center;"|15–0–3
|- style="background:#cfc;"
|
| style="text-align:center;"|Win
| Marloes Merza
|Stare Down City
| Oostzaan, Netherlands
| style="text-align:center;"|Decision
|align=center|5
|align=center|3:00
| style="text-align:center;"|14–0–3
|- style="background:#cfc;"
|
| style="text-align:center;"|Win
| Hatice Ozyurt
| 
| Netherlands, 
| style="text-align:center;"|Decision
|align=center|5
|align=center|
| style="text-align:center;"|13–0–3
|- style="background:#cfc;"
|
| style="text-align:center;"|Win
| Jennifer Trustfull
| 
| Deventer, Netherlands
| style="text-align:center;"|TKO
|align=center|5
|align=center|
| style="text-align:center;"|12–0–3
|- style="background:#cfc;"
|
| style="text-align:center;"|Win
| Debbie Blok
| 
| Den Helder, Netherlands
| style="text-align:center;"|KO
|align=center|4
|align=center|
| style="text-align:center;"|11–0–3
|- style="background:#cfc;"
|
| style="text-align:center;"|Win
| Janneke van Heteren
| 
| Netherlands, 
| style="text-align:center;"|KO
|align=center|1
|align=center|
| style="text-align:center;"|10–0–3
|- style="background:#cfc;"
|
| style="text-align:center;"|Win
| Anna Zieglerova
| Gym Alkmaar Fight Gala
| Alkmaar, Netherlands
| style="text-align:center;"|KO
|align=center|2
|align=center|
| style="text-align:center;"|9–0–3
|- style="background:#c5d2ea;"
|
| style="text-align:center;"|Draw
| Marloes Merza
| Stare Down City
| Landsmeer, Netherlands
| style="text-align:center;"|Decision
|align=center|
|align=center|
| style="text-align:center;"|8–0–3
|- style="background:#cfc;"
|
| style="text-align:center;"|Win
| Jorien de Ruyter
| 
| Netherlands, 
| style="text-align:center;"|Decision
|align=center|
|align=center|
| style="text-align:center;"|8–0–2
|- style="background:#cfc;"
|
| style="text-align:center;"|Win
| Kateřina Svobodová
|Stare Down City
| Landsmeer,Netherlands 
| style="text-align:center;"|KO
|align=center|
|align=center|
| style="text-align:center;"|7–0–2
|- style="background:#cfc;"
|?
| style="text-align:center;"|Win
| Marloes Merza
| 
| Landsmeer, Netherlands
| style="text-align:center;"|Decision
|align=center|
|align=center|
| style="text-align:center;"|6–0–2
|- style="background:#cfc;"
|?
| style="text-align:center;"|Win
| Rayen Aydin
| 
| Netherlands, 
| style="text-align:center;"|TKO
|align=center| 1
|align=center| 0:40
| style="text-align:center;"|5–0–2
|- style="background:#c5d2ea;"
|
| style="text-align:center;"|Draw
| Patricia Mannaart
| 
| Zaandam, Netherlands
| style="text-align:center;"|Decision
|align=center|
|align=center|
| style="text-align:center;"|4–0–2
|- style="background:#cfc;"
|?
| style="text-align:center;"|Win
| Raquel Koster
| 
| Netherlands, 
| style="text-align:center;"|Decision
|align=center|
|align=center|
| style="text-align:center;"|4–0–1
|- style="background:#cfc;"
|?
| style="text-align:center;"|Win
| Raquel Koster
| 
| Netherlands, 
| style="text-align:center;"|Decision
|align=center|
|align=center|
| style="text-align:center;"|3–0–1
|- style="background:#c5d2ea;"
|?
| style="text-align:center;"|Draw
| Tatjana Bosman
| 
| Netherlands, 
| style="text-align:center;"|Decision
|align=center|
|align=center|
| style="text-align:center;"|2–0–1
|- style="background:#cfc;"
|May or oct. 8, 2001
| style="text-align:center;"|Win
| Kyle Jon
| Open Dutch Youth Championship
| Netherlands, 
| style="text-align:center;"|TKO
|align=center|
|align=center|
| style="text-align:center;"|2–0
|- style="background:#cfc;"
|?
| style="text-align:center;"|Win
| Tatjana Bosman
| Open Dutch Youth Championship
| Netherlands, 
| style="text-align:center;"|TKO
|align=center|
|align=center|
| style="text-align:center;"|1–0
|-
| colspan=9 | Legend''''':

Mixed martial arts record

|Loss
|align=center|1–3
|Maria Hougaard Djursaa
|TKO (retirement)
|European MMA 5: Frederiksberg
|
|align=center|2
|align=center|5:00
|Frederiksberg, Denmark
|
|-
|Win
|align=center|1–2
|Alexandra Buch
|Submission (guillotine choke)
|MMAB - MMA Bundesliga 1
|
|align=center|1
|align=center|0:52
|Herne, Germany
|
|-
|Loss
|align=center|0–2
|Danielle West
|TKO (punches)
|Girl Fights Only 7
|
|align=center|3
|align=center|N/A
|Netherlands
|
|-
|Loss
|align=center|0–1
|Cindy Dandois
|TKO (punches)
|Staredown
|
|align=center|2
|align=center|4:50
|Antwerp, Belgium
|

See also
 List of female kickboxers

References

External links
 Jorina Baars at Awakening Fighters

1988 births
People from Den Helder
Dutch female kickboxers
Living people
Dutch female mixed martial artists
Dutch Muay Thai practitioners
Featherweight mixed martial artists
Mixed martial artists utilizing boxing
Mixed martial artists utilizing Muay Thai
Welterweight kickboxers
Female Muay Thai practitioners
Featherweight kickboxers
ONE Championship kickboxers
Sportspeople from North Holland